The 1991 Valencian regional election was held on Sunday, 26 May 1991, to elect the 3rd Corts of the Valencian Community. All 89 seats in the Corts were up for election. The election was held simultaneously with regional elections in twelve other autonomous communities and local elections all throughout Spain.

For the third and final time to date, the Spanish Socialist Workers' Party (PSOE) won a regional election in the Valencian Community, regaining the overall majority of seats it had lost in the 1987 election. This was the last time the PSOE was able to access the Valencian government on its own, and the last until the 2015 election in which it went on to form the regional government of the Valencian Community.

As in other Spanish communities, the Democratic and Social Centre (CDS) saw a substantial drop in its vote share, causing it to fall below the 5% threshold and lose all its 10 seats. The party's poor results across Spain led to the resignation of party leader and former Prime Minister Adolfo Suárez and to the eventual demise of the CDS as a relevant actor in Spanish politics.

The main right of centre parties, both the newly founded People's Party (PP) (a merger of the People's Alliance (AP) and other right-wing parties) and the regionalist Valencian Union (UV), came out reinforced from the election, mainly at the cost of the declining CDS. However, they were left unable to command an overall majority of seats, unlike what happened in the city of Valencia in the same year's election, in which a post-election agreement between both parties managed to oust the PSOE from the city's government and elect 1987 AP regional candidate Rita Barberá as city mayor.

United Left (IU) maintained the results obtained by the IU-UPV alliance in the 1987 election. Valencian People's Unity (UPV) had broken its alliance with IU in 1988 and was left out of the Courts as a result, being unable to surpass the 5% regional threshold to win seats.

Overview

Electoral system
The Corts Valencianes were the devolved, unicameral legislature of the Valencian autonomous community, having legislative power in regional matters as defined by the Spanish Constitution and the Valencian Statute of Autonomy, as well as the ability to vote confidence in or withdraw it from a regional president.

Voting for the Corts was on the basis of universal suffrage, which comprised all nationals over 18 years of age, registered in the Valencian Community and in full enjoyment of their political rights. The 89 members of the Corts Valencianes were elected using the D'Hondt method and a closed list proportional representation, with a threshold of five percent of valid votes—which included blank ballots—being applied regionally. Parties not reaching the threshold were not taken into consideration for seat distribution. Seats were allocated to constituencies, corresponding to the provinces of Alicante, Castellón and Valencia, with each being allocated an initial minimum of 20 seats and the remaining 29 being distributed in proportion to their populations (provided that the seat-to-population ratio in any given province did not exceed three times that of any other).

The electoral law provided that parties, federations, coalitions and groupings of electors were allowed to present lists of candidates. However, groupings of electors were required to secure the signature of at least 1 percent of the electors registered in the constituency for which they sought election. Electors were barred from signing for more than one list of candidates. Concurrently, parties and federations intending to enter in coalition to take part jointly at an election were required to inform the relevant Electoral Commission within ten days of the election being called.

Election date
The term of the Corts Valencianes expired four years after the date of their previous election. Legal amendments earlier in 1991 established that elections to the Corts were to be fixed for the fourth Sunday of May every four years. The previous election was held on 10 June 1987, setting the election date for the Corts on Sunday, 26 May 1991.

The Corts Valencianes could not be dissolved before the date of expiry of parliament.

Opinion polls
The table below lists voting intention estimates in reverse chronological order, showing the most recent first and using the dates when the survey fieldwork was done, as opposed to the date of publication. Where the fieldwork dates are unknown, the date of publication is given instead. The highest percentage figure in each polling survey is displayed with its background shaded in the leading party's colour. If a tie ensues, this is applied to the figures with the highest percentages. The "Lead" column on the right shows the percentage-point difference between the parties with the highest percentages in a poll. When available, seat projections determined by the polling organisations are displayed below (or in place of) the percentages in a smaller font; 45 seats were required for an absolute majority in the Corts Valencianes.

Results

Overall

Distribution by constituency

Aftermath

Notes

References
Opinion poll sources

Other

1991 in the Valencian Community
Valencian Community
Regional elections in the Valencian Community
May 1991 events in Europe